The United Nations Angola Verification Mission I (I UNAVEM) was a peacekeeping mission that existed from January 1989 to June 1991 in Angola during the civil war. It was established by United Nations Security Council Resolution 626 on December 20, 1988.

In the civil war, the Soviet Union and Cuba backed the Movimento Popular de Libertação de Angola (MPLA), while South Africa and the United States backed the União Nacional para a Independência Total de Angola (UNITA). The MPLA became the stronger party.

UNAVEM I's purpose was oversee withdrawal of the Cuban troops. This mission was a success.

The United Nations created a follow up mission, United Nations Angola Verification Mission II, in 1991.

See also
 Cuban intervention in Angola
 O contexto das missões UNAVEM/MONUA, in: A participação da Hungria nas missões de paz da ONU em Angola
 Experiências dos operacionais húngaros em Angola depoimentos, in: A participação da Hungria nas missões de paz da ONU em Angola.

References

Angolan Civil War
United Nations operations in Angola
Organizations established in 1989
1991 disestablishments
1989 in Angola
1990 in Angola
1991 in Angola